The 7th Annual Helpmann Awards for live performance in Australia were held on 6 August 2007 at the Capitol Theatre in Sydney.

Winners and nominees
In the following tables, winners are listed first and highlighted in boldface. The nominees are listed below the winner and not in boldface.

Theatre

Musicals

Opera and Classical Music

Dance and Physical Theatre

Contemporary Music

Other

Industry

Lifetime Achievement

References

External links
The official Helpmann Awards website

Helpmann Awards
Helpmann Awards
Helpmann Awards
Helpmann Awards, 7th
Helpmann Awards